"One of Us" is a song by American singer Ava Max, released on January 12, 2023 through Atlantic Records as the fifth single from her second studio album, Diamonds & Dancefloors (2023). a visualiser for the song was released on January 27, 2023.

Background 
On January 10, 2023, Max announced "One of Us" through her social media, where she uploaded a snippet of a music video for the song and revealed its release date. The song was subsequently released two days later. It was written by Max, Caroline Ailin, Leland, Burns, and Cirkut, and produced by the two latter. The official visualizer music video was released on January 27, 2023, with the rest of the album.

Charts

Release history

References 

2023 singles
2023 songs
Ava Max songs
Song recordings produced by Cirkut (record producer)
Songs written by Ava Max
Songs written by Burns (musician)
Songs written by Caroline Ailin
Songs written by Cirkut (record producer)